John Robert Martin (born April 11, 1956) is a former Major League Baseball pitcher.

Martin attended Eastern Michigan University (EMU). He was a member of the 1976 and 1977 Mid-American Conference (MAC) Championship EMU teams. Martin is also a member of the EMU Hall of Fame.

The Detroit Tigers drafted Martin in the 27th round of the 1978 Major League Baseball Draft. The Tigers traded him to the St. Louis Cardinals with Al Greene for Jim Lentine on June 2, 1980.

After appearing in 9 games, starting 5, and winning 2 in his rookie year of 1980, with the St. Louis Cardinals, Martin recorded his best year in 1981, recording 8 wins against 5 losses, four complete games, and a 3.42 earned run average (ERA). In 1982, after a subpar start with a sore arm, he only started in 7 games, and finished the season mostly out of the bullpen (4–5, 4.23 ERA). Martin adjusted to pitching in relief and bounced back with a 3–1 record and 4.18 ERA. The Cardinals sold him to the Detroit Tigers on August 4, 1983. For the Tigers, Martin appeared in 15 games and had a 7.43 ERA.

References

External links
, or Retrosheet
Pura Pelota (Venezuelan Winter League)

1956 births
Living people
Arkansas Travelers players
Baseball players from Michigan
Bristol Tigers players
Detroit Tigers players
Eastern Michigan Eagles baseball players
Evansville Triplets players
Lakeland Tigers players
Louisville Redbirds players
Major League Baseball pitchers
Montgomery Rebels players
Navegantes del Magallanes players
American expatriate baseball players in Venezuela
Orlando Twins players
People from Wyandotte, Michigan
Rochester Red Wings players
Springfield Redbirds players
St. Louis Cardinals players